Andriy Anatoliyovych Teteruk (born 15 May 1973) is a Ukrainian politician and the commander of the Myrotvorets battalion. In September 2014, he was awarded the Order of Bohdan Khmelnytsky, 3rd class. Representing People's Front, he was elected to the Verkhovna Rada in the 2014 Ukrainian parliamentary election.

Teteruk took part in the July 2019 Ukrainian parliamentary election with the party Ukrainian Strategy. But he was not elected to parliament as the party did not win any seats (it won 2.41% of the national vote).

References 

1973 births
Living people
Military personnel from Vinnytsia
Eighth convocation members of the Verkhovna Rada
People's Front (Ukraine) politicians
Recipients of the Order of Bohdan Khmelnytsky, 3rd class
Ukrainian military leaders
Kyiv National University of Trade and Economics alumni
Politicians from Vinnytsia